Alok Sanjar (born 4 April 1963) is a Bharatiya Janata Party politician and was member of Indian parliament from Bhopal (Lok Sabha constituency) from 2014-2019. under modi government.
His wife is Kiran Sanjar and they have two sons, Ananat and Arpit.

References

Living people
India MPs 2014–2019
Politicians from Bhopal
Lok Sabha members from Madhya Pradesh
1963 births
Bharatiya Janata Party politicians from Madhya Pradesh